Klaus Wunder (born 13 September 1950 in Erfurt) is a German former professional footballer who played as a striker. For Bayern Munich, he was part of the club's European Cup victory in 1974–75. He earned one cap for the Germany national team and also represented West Germany at the 1972 Summer Olympics.

Honours 
Bayern Munich
 European Cup: 1974–75

References

External links 
 

1950 births
Living people
Sportspeople from Erfurt
German footballers
Footballers from Thuringia
Association football forwards
Olympic footballers of West Germany
West German footballers
Footballers at the 1972 Summer Olympics
Germany international footballers
Germany B international footballers
Germany under-21 international footballers
UEFA Champions League winning players
SV Arminia Hannover players
MSV Duisburg players
FC Bayern Munich footballers
Hannover 96 players
SV Werder Bremen players
Bundesliga players
2. Bundesliga players
Waldorf school alumni
German people of Austrian descent